Adamowo may refer to the following places:
Adamowo, Brodnica County in Kuyavian-Pomeranian Voivodeship (north-central Poland)
Adamowo, Lipno County in Kuyavian-Pomeranian Voivodeship (north-central Poland)
Adamowo, Sępólno County in Kuyavian-Pomeranian Voivodeship (north-central Poland)
Adamowo, Maków County in Masovian Voivodeship (east-central Poland)
Adamowo, Mława County in Masovian Voivodeship (east-central Poland)
Adamowo, Gmina Joniec in Masovian Voivodeship (east-central Poland)
Adamowo, Gmina Nowe Miasto in Masovian Voivodeship (east-central Poland)
Adamowo, Sierpc County in Masovian Voivodeship (east-central Poland)
Adamowo, Wyszków County in Masovian Voivodeship (east-central Poland)
Adamowo, Żuromin County in Masovian Voivodeship (east-central Poland)
Adamowo, Konin County in Greater Poland Voivodeship (west-central Poland)
Adamowo, Gmina Osieczna in Greater Poland Voivodeship (west-central Poland)
Adamowo, Gmina Włoszakowice in Greater Poland Voivodeship (west-central Poland)
Adamowo, Wolsztyn County in Greater Poland Voivodeship (west-central Poland)
Adamowo, Pomeranian Voivodeship (north Poland)
Adamowo, Działdowo County in Warmian-Masurian Voivodeship (north Poland)
Adamowo, Elbląg County in Warmian-Masurian Voivodeship (north Poland)
Adamowo, Iława County in Warmian-Masurian Voivodeship (north Poland)
Adamowo, Olsztyn County in Warmian-Masurian Voivodeship (north Poland)

See also
 Adamovo (disambiguation)